In condensed matter physics and black hole physics, the Sachdev–Ye–Kitaev (SYK) model is an exactly solvable model initially proposed by Subir Sachdev and Jinwu Ye, and later modified by Alexei Kitaev to the present commonly used form. The model is believed to bring insights into the understanding of strongly correlated materials and it also has a close relation with the discrete model of AdS/CFT. Many condensed matter systems, such as quantum dot coupled to topological superconducting wires, graphene flake with irregular boundary, and kagome optical lattice with impurities, are proposed to be modeled by it. Some variants of the model are amenable to digital quantum simulation, with pioneering experiments implemented in a NMR setting.

Model 
Let  be an integer and  an even integer such that , and consider a set of Majorana fermions  which are fermion operators satisfying conditions:
 Hermitian ;
 Clifford relation .

Let  be random variables whose expectations satisfy:

;
.

Then the SYK model is defined as

.

Note that sometimes an extra normalization factor is included.

The most famous model is when :

,

where the factor  is included to coincide with the most popular form.

See also
 Non-Fermi liquid

References 

Lattice models